Matteo Cotali (born 22 April 1997) is an Italian football player. He plays for Serie B for Frosinone.

Club career
He made his Serie C debut for Olbia on 27 August 2016 in a game against Renate.

On 3 July 2019, Cotali signed with Serie B club Chievo Verona.

On 6 August 2021 he joined Frosinone.

References

External links

 

1997 births
Footballers from Brescia
Living people
Italian footballers
Cagliari Calcio players
Olbia Calcio 1905 players
A.C. ChievoVerona players
Frosinone Calcio players
Serie C players
Serie D players
Serie B players
Association football defenders